This is a list of butterflies of Algeria. About 121 species are known from Algeria.

Hesperiidae
Borbo borbonica
Carcharodus tripolina
Carcharodus lavatherae
Carcharodus stauderi
Gegenes pumilio
Gegenes nostrodamus
Hesperia comma
Muschampia proto
Muschampia mohammed
Muschampia leuzeae
Pyrgus onopordi
Pyrgus armoricanus
Pyrgus alveus
Spialia sertorius
Thymelicus lineola
Thymelicus sylvestris
Thymelicus acteon
Thymelicus hamza

Papilionidae
Iphiclides podalirius
Papilio machaon
Papilio saharae
Zerynthia rumina

Pieridae
Anaphaeis aurota
Anthocharis euphenoides
Aporia crataegi
Catopsilia florella
Colias croceus
Colotis evagore
Colotis liagore
Colotis phisadia
Colotis chrysonome
Euchloe belemia
Euchloe ausonia
Euchloe tagis
Euchloe falloui
Euchloe charlonia
Gonepteryx rhamni
Gonepteryx cleopatra
Pieris brassicae
Pieris rapae
Pieris napi
Pontia daplidice
Pontia glauconome

Lycaenidae
Aricia cramera
Azanus ubaldus
Callophrys rubi
Callophrys avis
Celastrina argiolus
Cigaritis allardi
Cigaritis siphax
Cigaritis zohra
Cigaritis acamas
Cigaritis myrmecophilia
Cupido lorquinii
Glaucopsyche alexis
Glaucopsyche melanops
Kretania allardii
Kretania martini
Lampides boeticus
Leptotes pirithous
Lycaena phlaeas
Lysandra punctifera
Neozephyrus quercus
Polyommatus atlantica
Polyommatus amandus
Polyommatus icarus
Pseudophilotes abencerragus
Pseudophilotes bavius
Satyrium esculi
Tarucus theophrastus
Tarucus rosacea
Tarucus balkanica
Tomares ballus
Tomares mauretanicus
Virachola livia
Zizeeria knysna
Zizeeria karsandra
Zizina antanossa

Nymphalidae
Argynnis paphia
Argynnis pandora
Berberia abdelkader
Berberia lambessanus
Charaxes jasius
Chazara briseis
Chazara prieuri
Coenonympha fettigii
Coenonympha arcanioides
Coenonympha dorus
Coenonympha pamphilus
Danaus chrysippus
Euphydryas desfontainii
Euphydryas aurinia
Fabriciana auresiana
Hipparchia ellena
Hipparchia aristaeus
Hipparchia statilinus
Hipparchia hansii
Hipparchia powelli
Hipparchia fidia
Hyponephele lupinus
Issoria lathonia
Lasiommata megera
Lasiommata maera
Libythea celtis
Maniola jurtina
Melanargia galathea
Melanargia occitanica
Melanargia ines
Melitaea cinxia
Melitaea phoebe
Melitaea aetherie
Melitaea didyma
Melitaea deserticola
Melitaea deione
Pararge aegeria
Polygonia c-album
Pyronia cecilia
Pyronia bathseba
Pyronia janiroides
Vanessa atalanta
Vanessa cardui

References

Algeria
Algeria
Butterflies
Algeria
Algeria